Langdale Historic District is a historic district in Valley, Alabama and Harris County, Georgia, United States.  It was listed on the Alabama Register of Landmarks and Heritage on July 22, 1991, and the National Register of Historic Places (NRHP) on November 12, 1999.  It lies primarily in Valley, Alabama, on the West side of the Chattahoochee River.

See also
Riverview Historic District, located nearby.

References

External links
Historic American Engineering Record (HAER) documentation, filed under Valley, Chambers County, AL:

National Register of Historic Places in Chambers County, Alabama
Colonial Revival architecture in Alabama
American Craftsman architecture in Alabama
Historic districts in Chambers County, Alabama
Properties on the Alabama Register of Landmarks and Heritage
Historic American Engineering Record in Alabama
Historic districts on the National Register of Historic Places in Alabama
1991 establishments in Alabama